Agrial is a French agricultural cooperative and food-processor with operations in dairy, beef, poultry, vegetables and fruit. The company has a workforce of 12,000.

References

Agriculture companies of France
Food and drink companies established in 2000
French brands
Caen
Companies based in Normandy